Julia Sánchez Deza (28 January 1930 – 19 December 2001) was a Peruvian female track and field sprinter. Her greatest achievement was a gold medal in the 100 metres at the inaugural 1951 Pan American Games, seeing off Jean Patton of the United States. She was one of two Peruvian gold medallists at the games, alongside men's shooter Edwin Vásquez Cam. She remained her country's only female champion until hurdler Edith Noeding matched the feat in 1975.

She was born and died in the capital, Lima. She attended the National Physical Institute at the National University of San Marcos. For her achievements, she was awarded the Laureles Deoprtivos from the state of Peru.

Sánchez won back-to-back 100 m titles at the South American Championships in Athletics in 1949 and 1952. She was also a multiple medallist at the 1948 Extraordinary Championships, held to celebrate 400 years since La Paz's foundation: there she won golds in the 200 metres and long jump, as well as a high jump silver. Her first major international games was also her most successful: at the Bolivarian Games over 1947 and 1948, she was a three-time champion (50 metres, 100 m and 4 × 100 metres relay) and won a further two medals in the long and high jump.

International competitions

References

External links
 

1930 births
2001 deaths
Sportspeople from Lima
Peruvian female sprinters
Peruvian female long jumpers
Peruvian female high jumpers
Pan American Games gold medalists for Peru
Pan American Games medalists in athletics (track and field)
Athletes (track and field) at the 1951 Pan American Games
National University of San Marcos alumni
Medalists at the 1951 Pan American Games